Ann Lee (b. ) is a woman from Houston, Texas who founded Republicans Against Marijuana Prohibition (RAMP), a conservative American group in favor of legalization of cannabis. She has stated "prohibition is not conservative" and compared it to the unconstitutional Jim Crow laws of the American South. Lee is anti-abortion, voted for Donald Trump, and never smoked cannabis. Lee's group has been active at both in the state of Texas and at the federal level advocating legalization.

References

Further reading

External links
Ann Lee Founder/Executive Director at Republicans Against Marijuana Prohibition

1929 births
Living people
American cannabis activists
Cannabis in Texas
People from Houston
Texas Republicans